The 1968 season was the Hawthorn Football Club's 44th season in the Victorian Football League and the 67th overall.

Fixture

Premiership season

Ladder

References

Hawthorn Football Club seasons